The 1987 Northeast Louisiana Indians football team represented Northeast Louisiana University (now known as the University of Louisiana at Monroe) as a member of the Southland Conference (SLC) during the 1987 NCAA Division I-AA football season. Northeast Louisiana played their home games on-campus at Malone Stadium in Monroe, Louisiana. This Indians squad won the 1987 NCAA Division I-AA Football Championship Game.

The Indians were led by seventh-year head coach Pat Collins, and were led by first team All-America Stan Humphries. The squad completed the regular season with an overall record of 9–2 and finished 6–0 to capture their first outright Southland Conference championship. The Indians faced off against the Marshall Thundering Herd for the I-AA National Championship. In the championship game, Marshall took a 42–28 lead into the fourth quarter only to have Humphries lead the Indians to a pair of late touchdowns and captured the championship with their 43–42 victory.

Schedule

Team players in the NFL

References

Further reading
 

Northeast Louisiana
Louisiana–Monroe Warhawks football seasons
NCAA Division I Football Champions
Southland Conference football champion seasons
Northeast Louisiana Indians football